"Count Your Blessings" is a song composed by Reginald Morgan with lyrics by Edith Temple, c.1946.  It has been performed by Gene Ammons, Holly Cole, Gracie Fields, Aled Jones, Garrison Keillor, Josef Locke, The Luton Girls Choir, Dana, Phillip McCann, among others.

References

1946 songs